Lyra is a rural locality in the Southern Downs Region, Queensland, Australia.

Geography 
The western and central part of the locality is relatively flat but the eastern part of the locality consists of foothills of the Great Dividing Range.

Accommodation Creek flows down from the range from the south-east  (Wyberba) and exits to the north-west (Ballandean).

The New England Highway enters the locality from the north-west (Ballandean) and exits to the south (Wyberba). The Southern railway line runs parallel immediately to the east of the highway; there is no longer a railway station within Lyra.

The land use is a mixture of horticulture and grazing on native vegetation. There are a number of vineyards in Lyra, including those of Sirromet Wines at 115 Anderson Road. There are no protected areas within Lyra, but it borders Girraween National Park to the east.

History
The extension of the Southern railway line from Stanthorpe to  Wallangarra was completed on 14 February 1887 with the district being served by Lyra railway station, which was named by the Queensland Railway Department after the constellation Lyra. The locality takes its name from the railway station.

References

External links

Southern Downs Region
Localities in Queensland